On the night of 1-2 October 2012, a group of armed men attacked a student residence of Federal Polytechnic, Mubi, Adamawa State, eastern Nigeria, killing at least 25 men. The attackers used guns and machetes to kill 22 students and 3 other people. 

Major attacks also occurred in Mubi in 2014, 2017 and 2018.

References

2012 murders in Nigeria
2012 mass shootings in Africa
2010s massacres in Nigeria
21st century in Adamawa State
Attacks on buildings and structures in 2012
Attacks on universities and colleges in Nigeria
Mass murder in Adamawa State
Massacres in 2012
Mubi
October 2012 crimes
October 2012 events in Nigeria
Terrorist incidents in Adamawa State
Terrorist incidents in Nigeria in 2012
School massacres